First Circle is a Grammy Award–winning jazz album by the Pat Metheny Group. Released in 1984, it is the group's fourth studio release. Metheny is joined by Lyle Mays on keyboards, Steve Rodby on bass, Paul Wertico on drums, and Pedro Aznar on vocals, percussion, and guitar. First Circle won the Grammy Award for Best Jazz Fusion Performance.

History
Two personnel changes occurred. Drummer Danny Gottlieb was replaced by Paul Wertico, and the Group was joined by multi-instrumentalist Pedro Aznar, who had already established himself with the band Serú Girán in his native Argentina.

On First Circle, the Group used instruments it hadn't recorded with before, including the sitar ("Yolanda, You Learn"), trumpet ("Forward March"), and agogo bells ("Tell It All"). The first song, "Forward March", with Lyle Mays on trumpet, uses dissonant, out-of-tune chords and shifting time signatures. On putting the song first, Metheny remarked that it "seemed like a good idea at the time."

This was the first Group album to feature a song with written lyrics, "Más Allá," by Aznar.

First Circle expanded the scope of the Group's music. In a podcast retrospective, Metheny remarked that the album brought the Group to a creative high that he had been seeking since its foundation. "With the record, First Circle, I finally felt like the Group was what I hoped it might be someday...there was this feeling of, 'Okay, we've done it. We can go anywhere now.'" He  stated that First Circle, Still Life (Talking), and Letter from Home, among the Group's most popular albums, were part of a trilogy connected by their musical explorations and accessibly melodic personalities.

Along with "Phase Dance" and "Are You Going With Me?", the album's title track, "The First Circle", became one of the Group's most popular songs.

Track listing

Personnel
 Pat Metheny – guitar, Synclavier guitar, Dan Electro sitar guitar, slide guitar, acoustic guitar, acoustic 12-string guitar
 Lyle Mays – piano, synthesizers, Oberheim, agogô bells, organ, trumpet
 Steve Rodby – acoustic and electric bass, bass drum
 Paul Wertico – drums, field drum, cymbal
 Pedro Aznar – glockenspiel, voice, bells, acoustic guitar, percussion, whistle, guitar, acoustic 12-string guitar

Charts
Album – Billboard

Awards
Grammy Awards

References

Pat Metheny albums
1984 albums
ECM Records albums
Grammy Award for Best Jazz Fusion Performance